Pseudocayratia is a genus of Asian vine plants in the family  Vitaceae.  As its name suggests, it was split from the previously configured genus Cayratia, which was found not be monophyletic: for example, Pseudocayratia oligocarpa, from central China to Vietnam, was distinct from Cayratia pedata (the type species of that genus).  Species have been recorded from central-southern China, Japan, the Ryukyu Islands, Taiwan and Vietnam.

Species
Plants of the World Online currently includes:
 Pseudocayratia dichromocarpa (H.Lév.) J.Wen & Z.D.Chen
 Pseudocayratia oligocarpa (H.Lév. & Vaniot) J.Wen & L.M.Lu
 Pseudocayratia pengiana T.W.Hsu & J.Wen
 Pseudocayratia speciosa J.Wen & L.M.Lu - type species
 Pseudocayratia yoshimurae (Makino) J.Wen & V.C.Dang

References

External links
 

 Flora of Indo-China 
Vitaceae genera
Vitaceae
Taxa described in 2018